Vivek A. Kumar (born August 8, 1984) is an American scientist, innovator and entrepreneur. He is faculty at the New Jersey Institute of Technology (NJIT) and the Rutgers School of Dental Medicine; he was also previously the Dhiraj Shah Faculty Fellow at the NJIT Albert Dorman Honors College. At NJIT, he is the director of the KumarLab for Biomaterial Drug Discovery, Delivery, and Development Lab.

Vivek has also co-founded several startups.

Early life and education 
Vivek was born to Indian parents, grew up in Singapore where he attended Parry primary school, Kuo Chuan Presbyterian Secondary School for his O levels and Nanyang Junior College for his A levels.

He received a BSc in biomedical engineering from Northwestern University in 2006, pursuing research in synthetic biomaterials in the lab of Guillermo Ameer, ScD. In 2006, he started pursuing his doctoral in bioengineering with Elliot Chaikof, MD, PhD, at Georgia Tech and Emory University in Atlanta, where he was awarded the American Heart Association Predoctoral Fellowship, graduating in 2011.

Academic career 

Vivek began his post-doctoral work in 2011 with Elliot Chaikof at the Wyss Institute for Biologically Inspired Engineering and Beth Israel Deaconess Medical Center, a teaching hospital of Harvard Medical School. He continued his post-doctoral work with Jeffrey Hartgerink at Rice University in 2012 till 2016, and was awarded the NIH F32 fellowship for his work. At Rice University, Vivek alongside Jeffrey Hartgerink created a new high-tech hydrogel to aid healing and make natural tissue recovery easier for humans.

He currently serves at the NJIT as an assistant (2016-2022), associate (tenured 2022) professor in biomedical engineering, chemical engineering, biology; and Endodontics at the Rutgers School of Dental Medicine, funded by NIH, NSF and foundation grants.

He has co-authored over 50 peer-reviewed journal articles, over 6 dozen abstracts, co-invented over a dozen patents/applications; and mentored dozen of undergraduate, graduate and post-doctoral students.  As of January 2020 Vivek has been cited over 2,200 times and has an H-index of 26.

Business career 
He is the President and founder of startups namely, SAPHTx Inc, NangioTx, ForK Financials, and Pullup Technologies. During his academic career, he has successfully mentored students who have received notable funding from NIH, NSF and other foundations.

NangioTx, his Biotechnology startup, was awarded the TMCx Bioventures 2015 1st place award, 2016 OPEN prize and was the winner of the first pitch competition at the first Life Pitch Science Competition by Mid Atlantic Bio Angels in 2016. NangioTX was also a finalist for Mass Challenge 2016-2017 under the healthcare and life sciences category.

References

External links
 Vivek Kumar
 Dr. Vivek Kumar
 NJIT Biomedical Engineering Info Session
 Self-Assembled Peptide-Based Drugs and Biomaterials
 Dealing a therapeutic counterblow to traumatic brain injury
 A Nanostructured Synthetic Collagen Mimic for Hemostasis
 Dental Pulp Regeneration Using Novel Self-Assembling Peptide Scaffolds
 Dealing a therapeutic counterblow to traumatic brain injury
 Vivek Kumar, PhD

1984 births
Living people
People from Singapore
Harvard Medical School faculty
Indian scientists
Indian expatriate academics
American people of Indian descent
American bioengineers
American chemical engineers
21st-century American scientists